Chris Eakin is a journalist who was a newsreader on the BBC's 24-hour rolling news channel, BBC News, and a relief presenter on BBC News at One at weekends. He was one of the channel's launch presenters in 1997, and is a published author. He left the BBC on 28 May 2015.

Early life

Eakin was born in Northern Ireland and lived at Helen's Bay in County Down, then briefly moved to Spain. His father was a civil engineer. He moved to Heswall when he was 12. He learned to sail with the Fourth Heswall Sea Scouts, sailing at the West Kirby Marine Lake. He left Calday Grange Grammar School in 1979, which he attended with his two brothers, Michael and Clive.

Career
From 1979-83 he was at Wirral News. From 1983-85, he was a freelance journalist in Cheshire. From 1985-89 he was at the Liverpool Daily Post where he won North West Reporter of the Year. From 1989-90 he worked at Central TV as a journalist. From 1990-97 he was a reporter for Look North at Newcastle upon Tyne. He twice won regional journalist of the year.

BBC News

Eakin was most recently a presenter on BBC News. He has anchored outside news broadcasts from locations including Belgrade, Belfast, Beirut, Buckingham Palace, Tavistock Square in London and numerous UK floods including in Cockermouth, Tewkesbury and Boscastle, Cornwall. He was the main on-site anchor for BBC News after the Glasgow Airport terror attack in 2007. Eakin left the BBC on 28 May 2015 with his final show running from 11 am until 2pm.

Publishing
Eakin's book A Race Too Far describes the 1968 sailing race to be the first person to sail non-stop round the world single-handed.

Personal life
Eakin is a qualified RYA Yachtmaster Offshore. He lives in London with his wife, Deborah, who is a GP. His older brother Michael is Chief Executive of the Royal Liverpool Philharmonic, and his younger brother Clive works in BBC local radio in Warwickshire.

He is a world-class sailor and multiple award-winning skier, and a fan of Creedence Clearwater Revival. He has a 34-foot Hallberg-Rassy yacht.

References

External links
 His web page
 TV Newsroom
 BBC News
 Twitter

British reporters and correspondents
BBC newsreaders and journalists
Year of birth missing (living people)
Living people
British broadcast news analysts
People from Heswall